Dipsas lavillai is a non-venomous snake found in Argentina, Brazil, Paraguay, and Bolivia.

References

Dipsas
Snakes of South America
Reptiles of Argentina
Reptiles of Brazil
Reptiles of Paraguay
Reptiles of Bolivia
Reptiles described in 1993